Twang is the sound of a resonating string, or, by extension, a nasal vocal resonation.

Twang may also refer to:

Music
 Twang!: A Tribute to Hank Marvin & the Shadows 
 Twang!! a 1965 British musical by Lionel Bart
 The Twang, an indie rock band formed in 2003 from Tipton, England
 Twang (album), an album by George Strait
 "Twang" (song), the album's title track
 Twang (band), a 1980s indie band from Manchester and Preston, England

Other uses
 Twang (magazine), a Vanity Fair take on country music whose director of photography is Nancy Lee Andrews
 Twang, a monkey who played bass guitar in Animal Kwackers
 TWANG, the Toolkit for Weighting and Analysis of Nonequivalent Groups, developed by the statistics group of the RAND Corporation, contains a set of functions to support causal modeling of observational data through the estimation and evaluation of propensity score weights.

See also
 Tawang (disambiguation)